SAARC Chamber of Commerce and Industry, recognized as a regional apex trade body by South Asian Association for Regional Cooperation is a constellation of the eight national Federation Chambers of Commerce and Industry of the member states of SAARC. The rationale behind the creation of SAARC Chamber of Commerce and Industry of the SAARC countries was to promote trade and industry in the region and to develop and achieve common objectives in the areas of trade and industry, moreover, the SAARC Chamber of Commerce and Industry is also accepted as the voice of the private sector across the region.

Operations
Pursuant to the directive of SAARC Secretariat, SAARC Chamber of Commerce & Industry, assisted by the National Federations, submitted its draft constitution to the SAARC Secretariat and received its approval in December 1992. This signified the official recognition of the SAARC Chamber of Commerce and Industry (SAARC CCI) by all the national governments of SAARC as the apex body of all the National Federations of Chambers of Commerce and Industry of SAARC, namely

 Afghanistan Chamber of Commerce & Industry
 Bangladesh Chambers of Commerce & Industry 
 Bhutan Chamber of Commerce & Industry
 Federation of Indian Chambers of Commerce & Industry 
 Maldives National Chamber of Commerce & Industry 
 Federation of Nepalese Chambers of Commerce & Industry 
 Federation of Pakistan Chambers of Commerce & Industry 
 Federation of Chambers of Commerce and Industry of Sri Lanka

References

International economic organizations
Chamber of Commerce and Industry
Chambers of commerce